Phenacogaster is a genus of characins from South America, with 20 currently described species:
 Phenacogaster apletostigma Z. M. S. de Lucena & Gama, 2007
 Phenacogaster beni C. H. Eigenmann, 1911
 Phenacogaster calverti (Fowler, 1941)
 Phenacogaster capitulatus Z. M. S. de Lucena & L. R. Malabarba, 2010
 Phenacogaster carteri (Norman, 1934)
 Phenacogaster franciscoensis C. H. Eigenmann, 1911
 Phenacogaster jancupa L. R. Malabarba & Z. M. S. de Lucena, 1995
 Phenacogaster maculoblongus Z. M. S. de Lucena & L. R. Malabarba, 2010
 Phenacogaster megalostictus C. H. Eigenmann, 1909
 Phenacogaster microstictus C. H. Eigenmann, 1909
 Phenacogaster napoatilis Z. M. S. de Lucena & L. R. Malabarba, 2010
 Phenacogaster ojitatus Z. M. S. de Lucena & L. R. Malabarba, 2010
 Phenacogaster pectinatus (Cope, 1870)
 Phenacogaster prolatus Z. M. S. de Lucena & L. R. Malabarba, 2010
 Phenacogaster retropinnus Z. M. S. de Lucena & L. R. Malabarba, 2010
 Phenacogaster simulatus Z. M. S. de Lucena & L. R. Malabarba, 2010
 Phenacogaster suborbitalis C. G. E. Ahl, 1936
 Phenacogaster tegatus (C. H. Eigenmann, 1911)
 Phenacogaster wayampi Le Bail & Z. M. S. de Lucena, 2010
 Phenacogaster wayana Le Bail & Z. M. S. de Lucena, 2010

References
 

Characidae
Fish of South America